John King (25 November 1888 – 9 August 1984) was a Scottish professional footballer who played as an inside right in the Scottish League and the Football League, most notably for Partick Thistle and Newcastle United respectively.

Career 
An inside right, King had a long career in the Scottish and the English leagues and played top-division football for Partick Thistle (two spells), Newcastle United (two spells),  Third Lanark, Motherwell, Hibernian and Clydebank. In 1915 he played a full league match for Newcastle as goalkeeper after regular Bill Mellor was injured, keeping a clean sheet.

At international level, King was capped by Scotland Juniors and came into consideration for a full cap, evidenced by his selection for the Home Scots v Anglo-Scots trial match in 1913. He made one appearance for the Scottish League XI in 1912.

Personal life 
King's uncle Alex was a Scottish international footballer. He served as a private on home service with the Cameronians (Scottish Rifles) during the First World War.

Career statistics

References

Scottish footballers
English Football League players
Footballers from North Lanarkshire
Sportspeople from Shotts
British Army personnel of World War I
Scottish Football League players
St Bernard's F.C. players
1888 births
1984 deaths
Newcastle United F.C. players
Association football inside forwards
Outfield association footballers who played in goal
Cameronians soldiers
Renfrew F.C. players
Partick Thistle F.C. players
Dykehead F.C. players
Third Lanark A.C. players
Motherwell F.C. players
Newcastle United F.C. wartime guest players
Hibernian F.C. players
Clydebank F.C. (1914) players
Scottish Football League representative players
Scottish Junior Football Association players
Scotland junior international footballers